The 1984–85 Chicago Black Hawks season was the 59th season of the Hawks' existence.

Offseason
Long-time goalie Tony Esposito retired from the team after a 16-year career in the NHL.  Esposito had been with the Black Hawks in his entire career, appearing in 873 games, and earning a 418-302-147 record with a 2.93 GAA and 74 shutouts.

On June 9, the Black Hawks traded away goaltender Bob Janecyk, their first round, sixth overall pick, as well as their third and fourth round draft picks in the 1984 NHL Entry Draft to the Los Angeles Kings in exchange for the Kings first round, third overall draft pick and their fourth round pick in the draft.  By moving up three spots in the draft, the Black Hawks drafted local prospect Ed Olczyk.  Olczyk, born in Chicago, spent the 1983–84 season playing with the U.S. National Team, scoring 21 goals and 68 points in 62 games.  At the 1984 Winter Olympics, Olczyk scored two goals and seven points in six games for the USA.

On June 19, the Hawks traded away defenceman Don Dietrich, forward Rich Preston and future considerations to the New Jersey Devils for forward Bob MacMillan and future considerations.  MacMillan appeared in 71 games for the Devils in 1983-84, scoring 17 goals and 40 points.  He was a former winner of the Lady Byng Trophy in 1979 while playing for the Atlanta Flames.

Regular season
The Black Hawks started the season off with a solid 9-6-2 record in their first 17 games, which had the team in first place in the Norris Division.  The Hawks slumped to a 13-22-1 record over the next 36 games, dropping them to a 22-28-3 record overall, and into second place in the division.  Following a 6–4 loss to the St. Louis Blues on February 3, the team fired head coach Orval Tessier, as he was replaced with general manager Bob Pulford.  Under Pulford, the Black Hawks finished the season on a 16-7-4 run in last 27 games, finishing the season 38-35-7, earning 83 points and second place in the division.  This was a 15-point improvement over the 1983-84 season, as the club qualified for the post-season for the sixteenth consecutive season.

Chicago was led offensively by Denis Savard, who scored 38 goals and a team high 105 points in 79 games.  Steve Larmer led the club with 46 goals, and was second in points with 86 while appearing in all 80 games.  Rookie Ed Olczyk had 20 goals and 50 points in 70 games.  Al Secord led the Black Hawks in penalty minutes, getting 193 in only 51 games.

On defence, Doug Wilson scored 22 goals and 76 points in 78 games to lead the blueline in scoring.  He also had a team high +23 rating.  Bob Murray had five goals and 43 points in 80 games, while Behn Wilson scored 10 goals and 33 points in 76 games, as well as earning 185 penalty minutes.

In the net, Murray Bannerman appeared in a club high 60 games, earning a 27-25-4 record with a 3.83 GAA and a .884 save percentage.  Warren Skorodenski backed him up, earning a record of 11-9-3 in 27 games, with a 3.22 GAA and a league leading save percentage of .903.  He also earned two shutouts.

Final standings

Schedule and results

Playoffs

Chicago Black Hawks 3, Detroit Red Wings 0
The Black Hawks opened the 1985 Stanley Cup Playoffs against the Detroit Red Wings.  Detroit finished the regular season with a 27-41-12 record, earning 66 points, which was 17 fewer points than Chicago, and third place in the Norris Division.

The series opened on April 10 at Chicago Stadium, and Doug Wilson opened the scoring for the Black Hawks 4:26 into the game on the power play.  Curt Fraser then scored 21 seconds later, giving Chicago a very early 2–0 lead.  Denis Savard and Ken Yaremchuk scored two more goals, giving Chicago a 4–0 lead in the first period, before the Red Wings Bob Manno scored with 29 seconds remaining in the period, cutting the Hawks lead to 4–1.  In the second period, Jack O'Callahan scored for the Hawks 17 seconds into the period, restoring the Hawks four-goal lead, however, the Wings Reed Larson scored three minutes later, making the score 5–2.  The Black Hawks then erupted for three goals, as Behn Wilson, Ed Olczyk and Steve Larmer scored, making it 8-2 for Chicago.  John Ogrodnick answered for Detroit in the final minute of the period, making the score 8-3 for the Hawks after two periods.  In the third period, Ed Olczyk scored his second goal of the game, making it 9-3 for Chicago, however, the Wings scored twice before the game ended, making the final score a 9-5 Black Hawks victory.

In the second game at home, the Hawks got off to another quick start, scoring three goals in the first period, as Darryl Sutter, Ken Yaremchuk and Al Secord scored to make it 3-0 for Chicago after the first period.  After a scoreless second period, Curt Fraser scored early in the third period, making it 4–0, before the Wings Joey Kocur responded with a goal of his own, cutting the lead to 4–1.  The Hawks Keith Brown and Doug Wilson scored to cap off a 6–1 victory, and gave Chicago a 2–0 series lead.

The third game shifted to Joe Louis Arena in Detroit, and the Black Hawks opened the scoring once again, as Steve Ludzik scored the lone first period goal in the game, giving Chicago a 1–0 lead.  The Hawks extended their lead to 4–0, after goals by Steve Larmer, Darryl Sutter and Denis Savard in a 2:56 span midway through the second period.  Ron Duguay responded for the Red Wings, cutting the Hawks lead to 4-1 after two periods.  In the third period, the Hawks extended their lead to 7-1 after goals by Ed Olczyk, Denis Savard and Behn Wilson.  Steve Yzerman scored late in the third period, making it 7-2 for Chicago, however, Rick Paterson restored the six-goal lead for the Hawks, who won the game by a score of 8–2, and swept the Red Wings in embarrassing fashion, outscoring them 23–8 in three games.

Chicago Black Hawks 4, Minnesota North Stars 2
The Black Hawks met the Minnesota North Stars in the Norris Division finals.  The North Stars struggled in the regular season, finishing with a 25-43-12 record, earning 62 points, which placed them fourth in the division.  In the first round of the playoffs, the North Stars upset the first place St. Louis Blues, sweeping them out of the playoffs.  In the 1984 Stanley Cup playoffs, the North Stars defeated Chicago in the first round.

The series opened at Chicago Stadium, and the Black Hawks took a 3–0 lead just 5:43 into the game after goals by Ed Olczyk, Doug Wilson and Tom Lysiak.  The North Stars responded with two goals of their own, cutting the Hawks lead to 3-2 after the first period.  In the second period, Minnesota scored four goals, taking a 6–3 lead.  In the third period, Jack O'Callahan scored for the Hawks, cutting the lead to 6–4, however, Steve Payne restored the three-goal lead for the North Stars.  The Hawks Behn Wilson scored with just under five minutes remaining in the third period, however, Tony McKegney scored an empty net goal with five seconds remaining, as the North Stars won the opening game 8–5.

In the second game, the teams played a scoreless first period.  The goals came quick in the second period though, as Keith Brown and Ken Yaremchuk scored 15 seconds apart, giving Chicago a 2–0 lead.  The North Stars Dino Ciccarelli and Tony McKegney scored two goals just a minute apart, tying the game 2-2, however, the Hawks Curt Fraser scored 11 seconds after McKegney's game tying goal, restoring the Hawks lead to 3–2.  Fraser added another goal later in the period, as did Al Secord, as the Hawks took a 5–2 lead.  In the third period, Troy Murray scored the lone goal, capping off a 6-2 Black Hawks victory.  After struggling in the first game of the series, Murray Bannerman made 25 saves for the victory.

The series moved to the Met Center in Bloomington, Minnesota for the next two games.  In game three, Minnesota got off to a quick start, scoring two goals in the first 9:53 of the game to take a 2–0 lead.  Bob Murray responded for Chicago, cutting the North Stars lead to 2–1, then Tom Lysiak tied the game late in the period.  In the second period, Al Secord scored two goals 2:08 apart late in the period, giving the Black Hawks a 4–2 lead.  Craig Hartsburg scored early in the third for the North Stars, cutting the Hawks lead to 4–3, however, Murray Bannerman made a number of good saves, and a late empty goal by Darryl Sutter finished off the 5–3 victory for Chicago, and the Hawks took a 2–1 series lead.

In the fourth game, the Hawks Steve Larmer scored 1:11 into the game, however, Minnesota tied it up on a goal by Ron Wilson.  Chicago retook the lead on a goal by Denis Savard, but the North Stars tied it up again only 16 seconds later on a goal by Randy Velischek.  Ed Olczyk gave Chicago the lead for the third time in the period, as the Hawks held on to a 3–2 lead after the first.  In the second period, Tom Lysiak extended the Hawks lead to 4–2, however, the North Stars Craig Hartsburg and Randy Velischek scored two late period goals, tying the game at 4-4.  Minnesota took their first lead of the game early in the third period on a goal by Gordie Roberts, however, Bill Gardner tied it up for the Black Hawks midway through the period.  The North Stars retook the lead on a goal by Tony McKegney just over two minutes later, but Denis Savard tied it up at 6-6 as he scored 47 seconds later, sending the game to overtime.  In the first overtime, the teams were held off the score sheet, with the Hawks outshooting Minnesota 8–7 in a very evenly played period.  Early in the second overtime, Darryl Sutter scored the game-winning goal for the Black Hawks, as they won the game 7–6, and took a 3–1 series lead.

The series shifted back to Chicago for the fifth game, and in the first period, it was all Black Hawks, as Denis Savard and Darryl Sutter scored to take a 2–0 lead after the first 20 minutes.  In the second period, Chicago extended their lead to 4-0 after goals by Al Secord and Steve Larmer.  Minnesota responded with two goals of their own, as Tony McKegney and Brian Bellows cut the Hawks lead to 4–2.  In the third period, Dino Ciccarelli scored midway through the period for Minnesota, cutting the lead to 4–3, then with just over three minutes remaining in the period, Tony McKegney tied the game for Minnesota.  In overtime, the North Stars completed the comeback on a goal by Dennis Maruk, winning the game 5–4, and cutting the Hawks series lead to 3–2.

In game six back in Minnesota, Tony McKegney gave the North Stars an early 1–0 lead, however, Steve Larmer tied the game 45 seconds later.  Craig Hartsburg restored the North Stars lead, but Darryl Sutter tied the game once again with a late period goal, making it 2-2 after the first period.  The North Stars took the lead again on a goal by Dennis Maruk, however, the Hawks tied it up again three minutes later after a goal by Tom Lysiak.  In the third period, Minnesota took a 4–3 lead on a goal by Dave Richter, only to have Chicago tie it up nearly two minutes later on a Curt Fraser goal.  Minnesota took the lead for the fifth time in the game midway through the third period on a goal by Keith Acton, but Chicago tied the game again after a Troy Murray goal with under five minutes left, sending the game into overtime for the third consecutive game.  In the extra period, Darryl Sutter scored with just under five minutes remaining, winning the game for the Black Hawks 6–5, and the series 4 games to 2.

Edmonton Oilers 4, Chicago Black Hawks 2
The Black Hawks advanced to the Campbell Conference finals for the second time in three years.  In the 1983 Stanley Cup playoffs, the Black Hawks faced the Edmonton Oilers in the conference finals, and were swept by Edmonton in four games.  Edmonton, who won the Stanley Cup in 1984, finished the 1984-85 season with a 49-20-11 record, earning 109 points, which was 26 more than the Black Hawks.  In the post-season, the Oilers swept the Los Angeles Kings in the first round, then swept the Winnipeg Jets in the Smythe Division final.

The series opened up at Northlands Coliseum in Edmonton, Alberta, and the Oilers took a 2–0 lead midway through the first period after goals by Glenn Anderson and Charlie Huddy.  The Hawks Ken Yaremchuk cut the Oilers lead to 2–1 with a goal, however, Paul Coffey scored for Edmonton, as they took a 3–1 lead after the first period.  In the second period, the Oilers scored four goals on only nine shots, as they took a 7–1 lead, as Jari Kurri scored twice, Charlie Huddy scored his second goal of the game, and Mark Napier also scored.  In the third period, the Oilers continue to pummel the Black Hawks, as they took a lead of 11-1 after goals by Willy Lindstrom, Wayne Gretzky, Pat Hughes, and Glenn Anderson.  Troy Murray scored a late goal for Chicago, making the final score 11-2 for the Oilers, who took a 1–0 series lead.

In the second game, the Oilers took an early 1–0 lead after a Glenn Anderson goal, however, Chicago tied it up with a Bob Murray goal.  Edmonton retook the lead when Jari Kurri scored, taking a 2–1 lead after the first period.  The Black Hawks tied it up just over five minutes into the second period on a goal by Darryl Sutter, however, Edmonton responded with a goal of their own by Larry Melnyk, making it 3-2 for the Oilers after two periods.  In the third, Jari Kurri scored midway through the period, followed by a Paul Coffey goal with just under five minutes left, giving Edmonton a 5–2 lead.  The Hawks Behn Wilson scored with 38 seconds remaining, making it 5-3 for the Oilers.  Then, Edmonton scored two empty net goals, one by Jari Kurri to complete the hat trick, and another by Glenn Anderson, as they won the game 7-3 and took a 2–0 series lead.

With the series shifting to Chicago for the third game, the Black Hawks took a 2–0 lead after the first period on goals by Jack O'Callahan and Steve Larmer.  The Oilers cut the Hawks lead to 2-1 after a goal by Jaroslav Pouzar, but Darryl Sutter scored just over three minutes later, giving Chicago a 3–1 lead.  Mark Messier scored for the Oilers early in the third period, cutting the Hawks lead to 3–2, however, Denis Savard scored four minutes later, followed by an empty net goal by Troy Murray, as the Black Hawks defeated the Oilers 5–2, cutting Edmonton's series lead to 2–1.

There was a lot of scoring to open the fourth game of the series, as Wayne Gretzky scored 2:52 into the game, giving the Oilers a 1–0 lead.  The Hawks Darryl Sutter and Ed Olczyk scored twice, giving Chicago a 2–1 lead, however, Mark Messier tied the game midway through the period.  Denis Savard regained the lead for Chicago on a goal with just under three minutes left in the period, however, Jaroslav Pouzar tied it up for Edmonton just 15 seconds later.  Only 57 seconds later, Curt Fraser scored for the Hawks, as they took a 4–3 lead, then Al Secord scored with 25 seconds left in the first period, making it 5-3 Chicago.  In the second period, Willy Lindstrom got the Oilers within one, making it 5–4, however, just under three minutes after his goal, Steve Larmer scored for Chicago, giving them a 6–4 lead after two periods.  The Hawks extended their lead to 8-4 early in the third after goals by Steve Larmer and Bob Murray, however, the Oilers made the game interesting with goals by Glenn Anderson and Mark Messier late in the third period.  The Black Hawks hung on for the 8–6 victory, and tied the series at 2-2.

Back in Edmonton for the fifth game, Mike Krushelnyski scored for Edmonton just 1:11 into the game, giving them a 1–0 lead.  Troy Murray tied it up just over three minutes later, but Edmonton took the lead again on a Jari Kurri goal.  The Black Hawks tied it up again just over a minute later on a goal by Darryl Sutter, then Chicago took their first lead of the game on a Steve Larmer goal to make it 3-2 Chicago.  Jari Kurri scored his second goal of the game just over two minutes later, tying the score at 3-3 after the first period.  In the second, Denis Savard made it 4-3 for the Hawks 4:30 into the period, however, Mark Messier tied the game 21 seconds later.  Wayne Gretzky gave the Oilers the lead three and a half minutes later, then before the end of the period, Gretzky scored again, and Jari Kurri earned his second hat trick in as many games, as Edmonton took a 7–4 lead.  The Oilers continue to dominate in the third period, as they took a 10–4 lead after goals by Paul Coffey, Dave Hunter, and Lee Fogolin.  Darryl Sutter scored late in the game for the Black Hawks, as the Oilers won the game 10–5, and took a 3–2 series lead.

In the sixth game back in Chicago, the Oilers took a 2–0 lead into the first intermission after goals by Jari Kurri and Mark Messier.  Edmonton continued their dominance in the second period, as Jari Kurri scored twice, earning his third hat trick in as many games, as well as goals by Mark Messier and Lee Fogolin gave the Oilers a 6–0 lead after two periods.  In the third, Al Secord and Ken Yaremchuk scored for Chicago, cutting the Oilers lead to 6–2, however, Glenn Anderson and Jari Kurri, who scored his fourth goal of the game, capped off an 8-2 Oilers victory, eliminating the Black Hawks from the playoffs.

Player stats

Regular season
Scoring

Goaltending

Playoffs
Scoring

Goaltending

Note: Pos = Position; GP = Games played; G = Goals; A = Assists; Pts = Points; +/- = plus/minus; PIM = Penalty minutes; PPG = Power-play goals; SHG = Short-handed goals; GWG = Game-winning goals
      MIN = Minutes played; W = Wins; L = Losses; T = Ties; GA = Goals-against; GAA = Goals-against average; SO = Shutouts;

Awards and honors

Draft picks
Chicago's draft picks at the 1984 NHL Entry Draft held at the Montreal Forum in Montreal, Quebec.

References
 BlackHawks on Hockey Database

Chicago Blackhawks seasons
Chicago Blackhawks
Chicago Blackhawks
Chicago
Chicago